James Fellow Kyle, Jr. (born October 14, 1950) is an American lawyer and politician. He is a former member of the Tennessee Senate for the 30th district, which is composed of part of Memphis. He has served as a state senator since the 93rd Tennessee General Assembly, and he has been elected Democratic leader in the Senate since the 104th General Assembly.

Biography
Kyle graduated from Arkansas State University in 1973 with a Bachelor of Science degree in marketing. He was a member of Tau Kappa Epsilon fraternity and a recipient of the Distinguished Service Award at graduation. In 1976, he obtained a J.D. from the University of Memphis School of Law.

During the 95th General Assembly, Kyle was the Democratic Caucus Chairman, and during the 96th through 100th General Assemblies, he was the Chairman of the Select Oversight Committee on Corrections. Senator Kyle holds membership on the Senate Finance, Calendar, Judiciary, Rules, Delayed Bills Committees.

He is married to Sara Kyle who serves as Chairman of the Tennessee Regulatory Authority which is similar to most state's Public Service Commission. They have four children.

Kyle is a member of the Memphis Bar Association. From 1994 to 1998, he served on the Board of Governors of the American Correctional Association. He is also a member of Ducks Unlimited and serves on the Board of the University of Memphis Law School Alumni Association. Jim Kyle is a member of the law firm of Domico Kyle, PLLC in Memphis, Tennessee.

Kyle served as Senate Minority leader in the Tennessee State Senate.

Kyle filed paperwork to seek the Democratic nomination to run for Governor of Tennessee on July 2, 2009, but withdrew from the campaign in February of the following year.

In 2013 his wife, Sara Kyle, was reported to be considering a run for Governor of Tennessee in 2014.

References

External links
 
 Project Vote Smart

1950 births
Living people
Arkansas State University alumni
Nashville School of Law alumni
Politicians from Memphis, Tennessee
Democratic Party Tennessee state senators
University of Memphis alumni